Yeshiva Darchei Torah (located in Far Rockaway, Queens, New York, United States) is a private Orthodox Jewish boys' school.

History
The yeshiva was founded by the late Rabbi Yisroel Bloom and is headed by Rabbi Yaakov Bender, who was described by The New York Times as "ultra-Orthodox... Litvish or Yeshivish."

It has been operating long enough to have parents who graduated from it, including on the board of directors.
The Yeshiva will celebrate its 50th Anniversary next year in 2023.

The school is growing; a decade after having 1,400 students, it has over 2,000 enrolled students in pre-kindergarten through post-high school seminary. The bais medrash has been described as "large". In early 2019, the yeshiva notified parents that they had recently refinanced their mortgage.

On May 16, 2018, United States Secretary of Education Betsy DeVos became the first high-profile federal government official to visit a yeshiva, which was a two-day visit to Yeshiva Darchei Torah and to another school, a girls’ high school in Manhattan, called Manhattan High School for Girls. The visit was organized by the Agudath Israel of America organization.

Location
Darchei is located at the "site of...  a once-world-famous resort." Far Rockaway "flourished in the 1940s but withered... [in the] 1960s" until "a few Jewish families... started the Hebrew Free Loan Society for new home buyers." In 2008 The New York Times wrote that "the area's Orthodox Jewish community... now constitutes a fifth of the 48,344 people" and that Darchei, "with 1,400 students, exceeds Far Rockaway High School in size."

Elementary
The school's lower grades have grade-appropriate studies for both religious and secular subjects, supplemented by a library and a schoolwide literacy program. While most students benefit from the school's STEM offerings, Darchei's "policy of inclusion for some special-needs children" makes its special education wing an important component.

High school
Although the high school curriculum offers nine Advanced Placement classes and Regents exams, it also has "a vocational program for students who are struggling in a traditional academic program."

In June 2019, United States Ambassador to Israel David M. Friedman toured the yeshiva campus, including the Weiss Vocational Center, which had him in awe: "If I were still in yeshiva, I would be running to this very special and educational program, it's really a special thing and a big Kiddush Hashem".

The upper grade unit, which is named Mesivta Chaim Shlomo of Yeshiva Darchei Torah, encourages its students to participate in the science competition that is a part of the Center for Initiatives in Jewish Education (CJIE).

Senior divisions

The school also comprises a post-high school rabbinical college, Beis Medrash Heichal Dovid, and a postgraduate kollel, Kollel Tirtza Devorah, for married scholars.

Student body
Despite the school's Ashkenaz orientation, it serves a growing population of Sephardic families as well, and hosts annual visits of a Sephardic sage, Yaakov Moshe Hillel, who has been visiting Darchei since 2004.

Name
There are other (out of state) institutions using the name Darchei.

The words Darchei Torah mean "Paths of Torah."

See also
 Mesivta

References

External links
 

Orthodox yeshivas in New York City